John Kemble may refer to:

John Kemble (martyr) (1599–1679), English Roman Catholic martyr
John C. Kemble (1800–1843), New York politician
John H. Kemble (1912–1990), American professor of history and maritime historian
John Philip Kemble (1757–1823), English actor and manager
John Mitchell Kemble (1807–1857), English historian